The second and final season of The City began airing on April 27, 2010. Filming for the season had been in production since December 2009 and wrapped up in July 2010.

Cast
Season 2
  Main Cast Member
  Secondary Cast Member

Episodes

References

2010 American television seasons